Arab Motors TV is Now Arabgt.com

Arab satellite channel in both identity and content, broadcasting its programs to and from the MENA region, in general, and the GCC area, in particular. Arab Motors is a specialized channel in the world of automotive.

Current Programs 

 Arab Motors News
 New in the Market
 Chevrolet Supercars 2010-2011
 Classic Cars
 Drive It!
 Full Throttle
 History of Cars
 Motorshow
 Qatar Racing Club

 Special Event
 World's Greatest F1 Cars
 Time2Race
 Shift to Drift
 UAE National Race 2010-2011
 Middle East Rally Championship
 Losail International Circuit
 Porsche GT3 Challenge 2010-2011
 Turbo Legend

De listed Programs 

 Auto Makeover
 Barbican Turbo Show
 American Muscle Car
 Chevrolet Supercars 2009-2010
 Clubs in Action
 Monster Trucks

 On Location
 Power Building
 Premiere
 Saudi Star
 UAE National Race 2008-2009
 UAE National Race 2009-2010

External links
 Official website

Television channels and networks about cars
Television channels and stations established in 2009